Benjamin Mee may refer to:
Ben Mee (born 1989), English footballer
Benjamin Mee, owner of Dartmoor Zoological Park and author of We Bought a Zoo